Plata Glacier is a glacier in the Victory Mountains, Victoria Land, flowing north between the Mirabito Range and the Monteath Hills into Jutland Glacier. One of several features in the Victory Mountains named after naval encounters, its name commemorates the naval battle of the Rio de la Plata, fought in December 1939. It was named by the NZ-APC on the suggestion of R.H. Findlay, NZ-ARP geologist to the area from 1981–82.

Glaciers of Pennell Coast